Tarea may refer to:
Homework (1991 film), a Mexican drama film

People with the name
Tarea Hall Pittman (1903–1991), American civil rights leader
Tarea Sturrup (born 1995), Miss Universe Bahamas 2019

See also

1 Chronicles 8:34–35, where Tarea is listed among the grandsons of Meribbaal